Niklas Zennström (born 16 February 1966) is a Swedish entrepreneur and technology investor. Zennström is also the co-founder of the charity organization Zennström Philanthropies.

Education
Zennström has dual degrees in Business Administration (BSc)  and Engineering Physics (MSc) from the Uppsala University. He spent his final year at the University of Michigan, Ann Arbor, US.

Career
Zennström started his professional career in 1991 at the European telecom operator Tele2. He went on to serve in various business development roles including launching and being responsible for the European Internet Service Provider business get2net and as CEO of the everyday.com portal.

In 2000, Zennström and Janus Friis co-founded Kazaa, the peer-to-peer file sharing application. Whilst Niklas served as CEO, the program became the world's most downloaded Internet software in 2003. After lawsuits were filed by members of the music and motion picture industry in the US, Kazaa was sold to Sharman Networks.

Zennström then founded and served as CEO at Joltid, a software company developing and marketing peer-to-peer solutions and traffic optimization technologies. Zennström also co-founded Altnet, the world's first secure peer-to-peer network promoting commercial content to consumers integrating promotion, distribution, and payment of digital content.

Zennström is best known for founding Skype, a telephony company based on peer-to-peer principles. In October 2005, Skype was acquired by eBay for €2.1 billion ($2.6 billion) plus the potential to earn further performance-based bonuses up to €1.2bn. Zennström was CEO from Skype's inception until September 2007. After the sale of Skype, Zennström went on in 2007 to launch Joost, an online video distribution service.

In 2009, Zennström was part of the investment consortium that bought Skype Technologies from eBay and re-joined the Skype board. Currently, Zennström runs Atomico. Based in London, the firm primarily invests in tech companies. Through Atomico they have invested in over 200 companies on four continents, including Supercell, Rovio, Last.fm, Fon, Rdio, Fab, Klarna, and Skype.

In May 2011, Skype was purchased by Microsoft for $8.5 billion. It is reported that Zennström and Friis made approximately $1bn between them from the sale.

In November 2014, Zennström was inducted into SUP46's Swedish Startup Hall of Fame.

Zennström is founder and former president of the European Tech Alliance (EUTA), a group of tech companies located around in Europe. The EUTA focusses and promotes on Europe's tech industry.

Philanthropy 
Together with his wife Catherine, he founded Zennström Philanthropies which funds and donates to causes such as climate change and social entrepreneurship.

Honors and awards
Zennström was recognized by Time Magazine as one of its 100 Most Influential People in 2006, and has received numerous other awards for innovation and entrepreneurship.

In 2006, he was voted Entrepreneur of the Year in the European Business Leaders Awards (EBLA).

In October 2009, the KTH Royal Institute of Technology, Sweden, awarded Zennström the KTH Great Prize "for his outstanding entrepreneurial and technological skills".

In September 2011, Zennström received a Lifetime Achievement Award from Oxford University's Oxford Internet Institute.

In February 2013, Zennström was awarded H. M. The King's Medal of 12th size with a bright blue ribbon for significant contributions to Swedish industry and society.

In October 2013, the Royal Swedish Academy of Engineering Sciences, IVA, awarded Zennström the gold medal for his "highly successful entrepreneurial achievements, creative innovation, high technical competence and outstanding leadership".

Personal life
Zennström is married to Catherine Zennström. He is a keen yachtsman and he has built and raced yachts in the TP 52 .

References

External links

 Atomico Ventures
 Zennström Philanthropies

1966 births
Living people
Swedish billionaires
Skype people
Swedish technology company founders
Swedish chief executives
Swedish chairpersons of corporations
Venture capitalists
Businesspeople in software
Swedish company founders
University of Michigan alumni